Kutski (born John Walker on 4 February 1982) is a British radio DJ, from Chester, England. He presented various shows for BBC Radio 1, playing a variety of hard dance music, including breakbeat, electro, hard trance, hardcore and hardstyle. Kutski now produces and hosts a weekly podcast, "Keeping the Rave Alive", which plays music similar to that heard on his BBC Radio 1 shows.

Career
Kutski started DJing aged 15. The first big event he played was Elevate in Bangor, which resulted in a residency. Since then he has appeared at underground and mainstream hard dance clubs across the UK. He incorporates DMC-style scratching and mixing into every set.

His residencies have included Tasty in London, Ripsnorter in Bristol, and Elevate in Bangor.

In 2004, Kutski released his debut track "Making Me Itch" under the name SPX. He signed to the Knuckleheadz label and was featured on the compilations Insomnia 4 and Extreme Euphoria 3.

His tune "Closer To God", released on X-Cite, was reviewed positively and supported by Anne Savage, Lisa Lashes and The Tidy Boys. A collaboration with Ollie from Warp Brothers was signed for release on the Tidy Tools EP, and featured on the Tidy Addict compilation. Kustki was one of the three DJs, alongside Steve Hill and Zatox, to mix the 2012 Hard Dance Awards Album.

Kutski works for DJ Magazine as a hard dance and hardcore column writer, and also has a YouTube channel about his production techniques. He also works with manufacturers Vestax, Serato, Native Instruments, Stanton & Akai and Pioneer to test out software or kits.

In Summer 2010, Kutski played at a number of large festivals, including Creamfields, Dance Valley, Global Gathering, Electrocity, Planet Love, and Parklife. His tours included USA, Canada, Australia, New Zealand, Sweden, Poland, the Netherlands and Germany, trips to Ayia Napa, Tenerife, Gran Canaria and Kavos.

2010 also saw Kutski collaborate with Kiddfectious King Alex Kidd for the launch of The Kidd & Kutski Experience, in which the duo mixed the first hard dance covermount CD on Mixmag in almost a decade.

References

External links
 

British radio DJs
Living people
1982 births
BBC Radio 1 presenters
Hardstyle musicians